Beaussault is a commune in the Seine-Maritime department in the Normandy region in northern France.

Geography

Population

Places of interest
 Traces of a priory.
 The ruins of a castle, dating from the thirteenth century.
 The church of St. Germain, dating from the twelfth century.
 The chapel of St.Jean-Baptiste, dating from the eleventh century.

See also
Communes of the Seine-Maritime department

References

Communes of Seine-Maritime